Frankl is a surname. Notable people with the surname include:

 Ludwig August von Frankl (1810–1894), Austrian writer and philanthropist
 Michal Frankl (born 1974), Czech historian
 Nicholas Frankl (born 1971), British-Hungarian entrepreneur 
 Paul Frankl (1878–1962), German art historian
 Paul T. Frankl (1886–1958), Austrian Art Deco furniture designer and maker, architect, painter, and writer
 Paulette Frankl (born 1937), American courtroom artist
 Peter Frankl (born 1935), British pianist
 Péter Frankl (born 1953), Hungarian mathematician
 Spencer Frankl (c. 1933–2007), American dentist
 Viktor Frankl (1905–1997), Austrian psychiatrist and neurologist; founder of Logotherapy
 Wilhelm Frankl (1893–1917), German military aviator

See also 
 Frankel
 Fränkel
 Frank (surname)